Martin O'Connell (born 29 August 1963 in Carlanstown, County Meath) is an Irish former sportsperson. He played Gaelic football with his local club St Michael's and was a senior member of the Meath county team from 1984 until 1997.  O'Connell was listed on the "An Post/GAA Football Team of the Millennium".

In a senior inter-county career that spanned two decades, O'Connell won every honour in the game at senior level. O'Connell claimed a Meath record of six Leinster and three National Football League titles.

O'Connell has also been the recipient of many awards off the field. He claimed four All Star awards as well as being named Texaco Footballer of the Year in his final playing season in 1996. Shortly after his inter-county career ended O'Connell was named in the left wing-back position on the GAA Football Team of the Millennium.

In May 2020, the Irish Independent named O'Connell as one of the "dozens of brilliant players" who narrowly missed selection for its "Top 20 footballers in Ireland over the past 50 years".

The All-Ireland medal he won in 1987 was stolen during a burglary in November 2020 but retrieved a short time later.

See also 
 List of people on stamps of Ireland

References

External links
Hogan Stand Article

 

1963 births
Living people
Gaelic football backs
Irish butchers
Meath inter-county Gaelic footballers
St Michael's (Meath) Gaelic footballers
Texaco Footballers of the Year
Winners of three All-Ireland medals (Gaelic football)